Sălsig is a commune in Maramureș County, Crișana, Romania. It is composed of a single village, Sălsig. It also included Gârdani village until 2004, when it was split off to form a separate commune.

References

Communes in Maramureș County
Localities in Crișana